The Arrondissement of Turnhout is one of the three administrative arrondissements in the Province of Antwerp, Belgium. It is both an administrative and a judicial arrondissement. The territory of the Judicial Arrondissement of Turnhout coincides with that of the Administrative Arrondissement of Turnhout and part of the Campine region.

Municipalities
The Administrative Arrondissement of Turnhout consists of the following municipalities:

Arendonk
Baarle-Hertog
Balen
Beerse
Dessel
Geel
Grobbendonk
Herentals
Herenthout

Herselt
Hoogstraten
Hulshout
Kasterlee
Laakdal
Lille
Meerhout
Merksplas
Mol

Olen
Oud-Turnhout
Ravels
Retie
Rijkevorsel
Turnhout
Vorselaar
Vosselaar
Westerlo

References 

Turnhout